Bina Kailipaina Nieper Mossman (January 7, 1893 – May 20, 1990) was a ukulele player, vocalist, composer, and Republican Party office holder.  She was tutored in music and pronunciation of Hawaiian words by Queen Liliuokalani.

Early life and family
She was born Bina Nieper in Honolulu to John Theodore Nieper and his wife Susan Kaiokulani Titcomb. Her father's family immigrated to Hawaii from Germany as sugar plantation laborers. She married stevedore Richard Norman Mossman in 1912.  They became parents of two sons, Richard Jr. and Sterling, and two daughters, Ynez and Mapuana. Sterling Mossman was a detective with the Honolulu Police Department by day, and followed in Bina's footsteps at night entertaining for two decades in Waikiki as Sterling Mossman and his Barefoot Bar Gang.

Music career
From 1914 until 1917, Bina Mossman's Glee Club rehearsed under Queen Liliuokalani's supervision at Washington Place. According to her 1971 account for the Watamull Foundation Oral History Project, at the Queen's lying in state and funeral, the glee club was chosen to be part of the kahili bearers who stood watch over her body for two hours at a time, waving the kahilis and singing Liliuokalani's compositions.

In the 1950s she formed the Kaahumanu Choral Group, an all female group composed of mothers, grandmothers and great grandmothers. They were billed as being direct descendants of Hawaiian royalty.

In 1950, Mossman wrote "Nâ Kipikoa" (Stevedore Hula), recorded by Genoa Keawe and her Hawaiians.

Political career
After the 19th Amendment to the United States Constitution gave women the right to vote, Mossman began working behind the scenes in Hawaii's Republican Party. With her first political convention, she involved herself in committee work, and was elected to handle music entertainment for meetings. By 1935, she was working in administrative positions with the territorial legislature. Mossman served as the first woman legislator from Hawaii's 5th district of Oahu for three terms, beginning in 1938.  That year, she was elected National Committeewoman of the Republican Party. She was appointed High Sheriff of Honolulu 1953–1957.

Later life and death
Bina Mossman died in 1990.  In 1998, she was elected to the Hawaiian Music Hall of Fame.

Discography

Citations

References

External links 

Bina Mossman Glee Club at Territorial Airwaves

 	

1893 births
1990 deaths
20th-century American musicians
Members of the Hawaii Territorial Legislature
20th-century American politicians
Native Hawaiian women in politics
Musicians from Honolulu
Politicians from Honolulu
Hawaiian ukulele players
Women territorial legislators in Hawaii
20th-century American women politicians